Mohammad Reza Khalatbari (March 22, 1948 – September 17, 2016) was an Iranian association footballer and coach.

During his 16 years as a professional football player, he never was given a yellow or red card.

Iranian international footballer, Mohammad Reza Khalatbari, is one of his distant relatives.

References 

1948 births
2016 deaths
Iranian footballers
Persepolis F.C. players
Shahin FC players
Niroye Zamini players
Mazandarani people
Association football midfielders
Sportspeople from Mazandaran province